Aginsky (masculine), Aginskaya (feminine), or Aginskoye (neuter) may refer to:
Aginsky District, a district of Agin-Buryat Okrug of Zabaykalsky Krai, Russia
Aginskoye, Zabaykalsky Krai, an urban locality (an urban-type settlement) in Zabaykalsky Krai, Russia
Aginskoye Urban Okrug, a municipal formation of Zabaykalsky Krai which this urban-type settlement is municipally incorporated as
Aginskoye, Krasnoyarsk Krai, a rural locality (a selo) in Sayansky District of Krasnoyarsk Krai, Russia